Deborah Olayinka Ayorinde (born 13 August 1987) is a British-Nigerian actress raised in the United States. She is known for her role in the Amazon Prime horror series Them (2021).

Early life and education
Ayorinde was born in London, England to Nigerian parents. She spent her childhood in London before relocating to San Jose, California when she was 8.

In May 2009, she graduated with honors from Howard University's John H. Johnson School of Communications with a Bachelor of Arts in Film Production. During her matriculation at Howard, she won the coveted Paul Robeson Best Actress award for her performance in a short film she wrote and directed. The film also won the award for Best Cinematography.

Acting career
Ayorinde's resume includes her work on Netflix's popular Marvel series Luke Cage, and as Simone (the “other woman”) in the American comedy film, Girls Trip. She starred opposite Cynthia Erivo and Janelle Monáe in Harriet, a biopic of African American abolitionist and political activist Harriet Tubman, and she also starred in a season of HBO's True Detective.

In 2019, it was announced that she had joined the cast of Amazon Prime's Them for which Ayorinde received rave reviews for her portrayal of the character, Livia "Lucky" Emory. She received an Independent Spirit Award nomination for her performance. 

In the same year, it was also announced that she had been added to the cast of Fatherhood. In June 2021, Fatherhood debuted at Number 1 on Netflix in both the United States and the United Kingdom.

Filmography

Film and TV Movies

Television

Awards and nominations

References

External links
 
 Deborah Ayorinde profile on Instagram

Living people
1987 births
21st-century British actresses
Black British actresses
English expatriates in the United States
English film actresses
English television actresses
English people of Nigerian descent
Howard University alumni